Statistics of L. League in the 2002 season. Nippon TV Beleza won the championship.

First stage

East

West

Second stage

Championship playoff

Position playoff

League awards

Best player

Top scorers

Best eleven

Best young player

See also 
 Empress's Cup

External links 
  Nadeshiko League Official Site

Nadeshiko League seasons
1
L
Japan
Japan